Mississippi Public Broadcasting (MPB) is the public broadcasting state network serving the U.S. state of Mississippi. It is owned by the Mississippi Authority for Educational Television (MAET), an agency of the state government that holds the licenses for all of the PBS and NPR member stations in the state. MPB's headquarters is located on Ridgewood Road in northeast Jackson. The public broadcaster was established as Mississippi Educational Television.

History
Mississippi was a relative latecomer to public broadcasting. By the late 1960s, it was the only state east of the Mississippi River without an educational television station licensed within its borders. The only areas of the state to get a clear signal from a National Educational Television (NET) or PBS station were the northwestern counties (from Memphis' WKNO) and the counties along the Gulf Coast (from New Orleans' WYES-TV and Mobile's Alabama Educational Television outlet, WEIQ).

in 1969, the Mississippi Legislature created the Mississippi Authority for Educational Television to create a locally focused educational television service for Mississippi. After almost a year of planning, WMAA (channel 29, now WMPN-TV) in Jackson debuted on February 1, 1970 as the state's first educational television station. It immediately joined PBS. The initial broadcast was written by Jeanne Lucket and produced and co-directed by Mims Wright, then Director of Public Affairs at Jackson NBC affiliate WLBT, and Joe Root, WLBT Production Manager.

Only four months after beginning operations, WMAA received unwanted national attention when it refused to carry Sesame Street because of its racially integrated cast. That decision was reversed 22 days later after a nationwide outcry. Six other stations began operation over the next few years, and the state network became known as Mississippi Educational Television, or simply ETV.

Public radio came even later, arriving in the state in 1983. Eventually, Public Radio in Mississippi (PRM) expanded to eight stations throughout the state.

In 2005, MAET adopted "Mississippi Public Broadcasting" as an umbrella on-air brand for all television and radio operations.

Programming 
Since its inception, MPB has produced many educational or instructional television programs from its Jackson studios. A partial list includes Tomes & Talismans, The Write Channel, The Clyde Frog Show, About Safety, Ticktock Minutes, Zebra Wings, Posie Paints, Project Survival, The Metric System, Media Mania, and Between the Lions.

Series include:
 Artifacts
 Between the Lions (2000–2010; national co-production with WGBH Boston)
 Fit to Eat, a cooking show hosted by chef and restaurateur Rob Stinson
 Job Bank (1970s-early 1990s)
 Mississippi Roads (1983–present)
 Mississippi Outdoors (1970s–present)
 Quorum (1976–2012)
 Southern Expressions
 Tomes & Talismans (mid–1980s)
 The Write Channel (1977; distributed by the Agency for Instructional Technology (AIT))
 Write Right (1985; aired as part of the GED series, which was distributed by Kentucky Educational Television)

MPB Television
As of 2009, the MPB television stations are:

Notes:
1. All stations added the -TV suffix to their callsigns on February 1, 1982.
2. WMPN-TV used the callsign WMAA from its 1970 sign-on (and added the -TV suffix to its callsign in 1982) until 1990.

Coverage areas

Translator

MPB received a construction permit for station WMAA, channel 43 in Columbus, in 1998. This permit was modified to specify digital-only operation and granted again in 2001. The permit expired June 27, 2003, without any construction having taken place. MPB has stated there are currently no plans or funding to build the station.

MPB Television covers nearly all of the state, as well as parts of Alabama, Tennessee and Louisiana. Additionally, WMAV is carried on DirecTV and Dish Network's Memphis feeds, bringing its programming to an additional 1.4 million people in Tennessee and Arkansas. Oxford is part of the Memphis market.

Digital television

Subchannels
The digital signals of MPB's stations are multiplexed:

Analog-to-digital conversion
During 2009, in the lead-up to the analog-to-digital television transition that would ultimately occur on June 12, MPB shut down the analog transmitters of its stations on a staggered basis. Listed below are the dates each analog transmitter ceased operations as well as their post-transition channel allocations:
 WMPN-TV shut down its analog signal, over UHF channel 29, on February 17, 2009, the original date in which full-power television stations in the United States were to transition from analog to digital broadcasts under federal mandate (which was later pushed back to June 12, 2009). The station's digital signal remained on its pre-transition UHF channel 20. Through the use of PSIP, digital television receivers display the station's virtual channel as its former UHF analog channel 29.
 WMAH-TV shut down its analog signal, over UHF channel 19, on February 17, 2009. The station's digital signal remained on its pre-transition UHF channel 16. Through the use of PSIP, digital television receivers display the station's virtual channel as its former UHF analog channel 19.
 WMAE-TV shut down its analog signal, over VHF channel 12, on June 12, 2009, the official date in which full-power television in the United States transitioned from analog to digital broadcasts under federal mandate. The station's digital signal relocated from its pre-transition UHF channel 55, which was among the high band UHF channels (52-69) that were removed from broadcasting use as a result of the transition, to its analog-era VHF channel 12.
 WMAU-TV shut down its analog signal, over UHF channel 17, on February 17, 2009. The station's digital signal remained on its pre-transition UHF channel 18. Through the use of PSIP, digital television receivers display the station's virtual channel as its former UHF analog channel 17.
 WMAO-TV shut down its analog signal, over UHF channel 23, on February 17, 2009. The station's digital signal remained on its pre-transition UHF channel 25. Through the use of PSIP, digital television receivers display the station's virtual channel as its former UHF analog channel 23.
 WMAW-TV shut down its analog signal, over UHF channel 14, on February 17, 2009. The station's digital signal, remained on its pre-transition UHF channel 44. Through the use of PSIP, digital television receivers display the station's virtual channel as its former UHF analog channel 14.
 WMAB-TV shut down its analog signal, over VHF channel 2, on February 17, 2009. The station's digital signal remained on its pre-transition VHF channel 10. Through the use of PSIP, digital television receivers display the station's virtual channel as its former VHF analog channel 2.
 WMAV-TV shut down its analog signal, over UHF channel 18, on February 17, 2009. The station's digital signal remained on its pre-transition UHF channel 36. Through the use of PSIP, digital television receivers display the station's virtual channel as its former UHF analog channel 18.

MPB Radio 
MPB Radio consists of eight stations covering most of the state. It airs mostly news and talk programming from NPR and other distributors of public radio programming, along with several locally produced shows.

Recently, MPB has added a 24-hour classical music service on its second HD channel, which now also airs on DT4 on all MPB television stations. It brands this programming as "Music Radio," while the original MPB Radio service is known as "Think Radio." Shows produced by MPB Music include the nationally distributed program Sounds Jewish. All of MPB's radio stations also air the Radio Reading Service of Mississippi on their FM subcarriers, which is also simulcast on the DT4 subchannel on the "Spanish/Audio Description" audio channel.

MPB Radio streams both of its services live in Windows Media and Mac formats.

Notes

References

External links

Mississippi Public Broadcasting collection in the American Archive of Public Broadcasting
MPB sign-on circa 1992 (in Black & White)
 

Television stations in Mississippi

PBS member networks
PBS member stations
NPR member networks
Television channels and stations established in 1970
1970 establishments in Mississippi